Pachlakhi is a village in Siwan district, Bihar, India.

Villages in Siwan district